State Road 238 (SR 238) was a short  stretch of two-lane undivided road, mostly in Hamilton County, that traveled southeast from near Fishers (a northeast suburb of Indianapolis) to Fortville.  The western portion was concurrent with Greenfield Avenue.

Route description 
SR 238 heads southeast from the interchange with Interstate 69, heading toward Fortville.  In Fortville, SR 238 enters town on Merrill Street and turns onto Michigan Street. At the intersection of Michigan Street and Main Street in Fortville is the eastern terminus of SR 238 at State Road 13.

History 
SR 238 connected Fortville and its western terminus at SR 37 in Noblesville.

Major intersections

References

External links

238
Transportation in Hamilton County, Indiana
Transportation in Hancock County, Indiana
Transportation in Madison County, Indiana